The Kinner Sportster was a 1930s American light monoplane built by Kinner Airplane & Motor Corporation.

Design and development 
The Kinner Airplane & Motor Corporation had been producing radial engines since 1919 decided to enter the light aircraft market. The first design was a single-seat low-wing monoplane the Kinner Sportster K with a fixed tailwheel landing gear. Further versions followed with different engines. The strut-braced, low-wing, open cockpit, conventional gear aircraft featured folding wings. In 1933, an improved version the Sportwing B-2 was introduced. An enlarged four-seat version was produced in 1935 as the Kinner Envoy. Kinner became bankrupt in 1937 and rights to the Sportster were acquired by the Timm Aircraft Company. The Sportster was also produced after the Bankruptcy by Security-National Corp as the Security S-1 Airster

Variants 
K Sportster
Powered by a  Kinner K-5 engine.
K-5 Sportster

B Sportster
Powered by a  Kinner B-5 engine.
B-1 Sportster
Powered by a  Kinner B-5 engine.
B-2R Sportster
B-2 Sportsters modified by Timm aircraft, with  Kinner R-5 engines, after Kinners bankruptcy;also marketed as the Timm 160.
Timm 160
Sportsaters modified by the Timm Aircraft Company powered by  Kinner R-5 engines.
Security S-1 Airster
Production of the re-named Sportster by Security-National Corp, formed by Kinner after the original company's bankruptcy

Specifications (B-1 Sportster)

See also

References

Notes

Bibliography

External links 
"Wings Of Airplane Fold Up In Three Minutes", Kinner K-5 Sportster with optional wing fold, Popular Mechanics, March 1934

1930s United States sport aircraft
Low-wing aircraft
Aircraft first flown in 1932